Sir Frederic Hamilton Piozzi Salusbury (17 November 1895 – 13 December 1957) was a British journalist and diplomat. He was also a member of the Salusbury Family.

Biography
Salusbury became a second lieutenant in the King's Shropshire Light Infantry (KSLI) in 1916, during the First World War. He served for three years in the regiment before being demobilized. After the war, he joined the Daily Herald. Salusbury served as a war correspondent in the Mediterranean during the Second World War and subsequently received his first posting as the acting British Ambassador to Greece due to his personal friendship with Paul of Greece. He later created the English edition of the Kathimerini after buying a majority holding in the paper.

References

 Wood, W De B., ed. The History of the King's Shropshire Light Infantry in the Great War (1914–1918). London: Medici Society, 1924.

1895 births
1958 deaths
King's Shropshire Light Infantry officers
British Army personnel of World War I
Ambassadors of the United Kingdom to Greece
Frederic